Christopher Menaul (born 25 July 1944) is a British film, television director and television writer. Since the late 1970s, Menaul has amassed credits in episodic television and by directing television films.

Filmography

Film
Feast of July (1995)
First Night (2010)
Summer in February (2013)
Another Mother's Son (2017)

TV
2015 Killing Jesus (film) (TV film)
2013 The Suspicions of Mr Whicher II
2011 Combat Hospital (TV series)
2011 Zen (TV mini-series)
2009 Above Suspicion (TV film)
2007 Saddam's Tribe (TV film)
2006 See No Evil: The Moors Murders (TV film)
2005 Secret Smile (TV film) 
2005 Planespotting (TV film) 
2004 Belonging (TV film)
2004 Wall of Silence (TV film)
2003 State of Mind (TV film)
2002 The Forsyte Saga (TV mini-series)
2000 One Kill (TV film)
1999 The Passion of Ayn Rand (TV film) 
1997 Bright Hair (TV film) 
1994 Fatherland (TV film)
1994 Homicide: Life on the Street (TV series)
1992 Great Performances (TV series)
1991 Prime Suspect (TV miniseries)
1989 Nice Work (TV series)
1989 Precious Bane (TV film)
1989 Tales of Sherwood Forest (TV series)
1988 Worlds Beyond (TV series)
1987 Casualty (TV series)
1987 Tandoori Nights (TV series)
1980-1986 Minder (TV series)
1984 Punters (TV film) 
1976-1984 Play for Today (TV series, also a writer)
1984 Treatment (TV film) 
1983 The Case of the Frightened Lady (TV film) 
1983 Tucker's Luck (TV series)
1981 BBC2 Playhouse (TV series) 
1976-1978 The Sweeney (TV series)
1977-1978 Target (TV series, also a writer)

References

External links

British film directors
British television directors
British television writers
Living people
1944 births